Thayer's gull (Larus glaucoides thayeri) is a subspecies of the Iceland gull. It is a large gull native to North America that breeds in the Arctic islands of Canada and winters primarily on the Pacific coast, from southern Alaska to the Gulf of California, though there are also wintering populations on the Great Lakes and the upper Mississippi River.  The species has occurred as a vagrant to Japan, Denmark, and other parts of western Europe.

Somewhat intermediate between American herring gull and Iceland gull in habit and appearance and at times considered conspecific with either species, the adult Thayer's gull in nonbreeding plumage has a pale gray mantle, with obvious blackish wingtips, and extensive brown streaking on the head and neck. The head, neck, breast, belly, and underwings are primarily white, and the legs are pink. There is a red spot on the lower mandible, and the color of the iris is generally dark. In summer, the head and neck are white, with the bill turning bright yellow with a larger red spot on the lower mandible. Juvenile gulls are brown, with black bills, and black legs which quickly fade to adult pink.

During winter, it is found in small numbers among mixed flocks of large gulls, though it may gather in large numbers in certain locations.  In summer, it is found on the tundra of high Arctic islands.  These gulls will lay 3 bluish or greenish eggs in nests lined with grass, moss or lichens.  Their voice consists of mostly mewing and squealing notes.

There is continuing debate about the taxonomic status of this species, and some authorities consider Thayer's gull to be the dark-mantled form of Iceland gull, with Kumlien's gull (variously treated as a subspecies of either Thayer's or Iceland gulls) as an intermediate example, forming a cline rather than separate species.  The American Ornithologists' Union considered Thayer's gull a subspecies of American herring gull from 1917 until 1973, when they determined it was a separate species from herring gull.  

After numerous papers had been written suggesting downgrading this species to a subspecies or even a morph of Iceland gull, the American Ornithologists' Union invalidated the Thayer's gull as a full species in the 2017 annual supplement to the American Ornithologists' Union checklist. Thayer's gull is now considered a subspecies of Iceland Gull. The British Ornithologists' Union follows the publication Birds of North America in lumping the three (thayeri, kumlieni, and glaucoides) as forms of Iceland gull.

Both the common and species names honor ornithologist John Eliot Thayer, and so the first part of its name is pronounced "THAY-erz".

References

del Hoyo, J., et al., eds. (1996). Handbook of the Birds of the World 3: 609. Lynx Edicions.

Sibley, David Allen. (2003). The Sibley Field Guide to Birds of Western North America

External links
Thayer's Gull at Avibase
Thayer's Gull taxonomic history, at Ontario Birds
Thayer's Gull at USGS
Flicker Field Guide Birds of the World Photographs

Thayer's gull
Birds of the Arctic
Birds of Canada
Thayer's gull